Matilda (Mechtilde) of Savoy (1390–1438) was a daughter of Amadeo, Prince of Achaea (also known as Amadeus of Piedmont or Amadeus of Savoy) and Catherine of Geneva.  She was the second wife of the Elector Palatine Louis III, whom she married on 30 November 1417.

Children
Matilda had the following five children:

  Mathilde (7 March 1419 – 1 October 1482), married:
 in 1434 to Count Louis I of Württemberg
 in 1452 to Duke Albrecht VI of Austria
 Louis IV, Elector Palatine (1 January 1424 – 13 August 1449)
 Frederick I, Elector Palatine (1 August 1425 – 12 December 1476)
 Rupprecht (27 February 1427 – 26 July 1480), Prince-elector archbishop of Cologne
 Margarete (ca. 1428 – 23 November 1466), a nun at Liebenau monastery

|-

1390 births
1438 deaths
15th-century German women
Burials at the Church of the Holy Spirit, Heidelberg
Electresses of the Palatinate